is a Japanese manga series written and illustrated by Yukio Tamai. It was serialized in Shogakukan's seinen manga magazine Weekly Big Comic Spirits from August 2014 to August 2015, with its chapters collected in four tankōbon volumes.

Publication
Kedamame is written and illustrated by Yukio Tamai. The manga was serialized in Shogakukan's seinen manga magazine Weekly Big Comic Spirits from August 25, 2014, to August 10, 2015. Shogakukan collected its chapters in four tankōbon volumes, released from December 26, 2014, to September 30, 2015.

The manga was licensed in France by Glénat.

Volume list

References

Adventure anime and manga
Historical anime and manga
Seinen manga
Shogakukan manga
Supernatural anime and manga